is a Japanese Professional baseball pitcher for the Fukuoka SoftBank Hawks of Nippon Professional Baseball.

Early baseball career
Matsumoto participated in the 2rd grade spring 85th Japanese High School Baseball Invitational Tournament and the 3rd grade summer 96th Japanese High School Baseball Championship as a pitcher at the University of Morioka Affiliated High School.

Professional career
On October 23, 2014, Matsumoto was drafted by the Fukuoka SoftBank Hawks first overall pick in the 2014 Nippon Professional Baseball draft.

He spent the 2015 season on right elbow rehabilitation.

On September 30, 2016, he pitched his debut game against the Tohoku Rakuten Golden Eagles.

From 2016 season to 2019 season, he recorded with a 29 Games pitched, a 4–7 Win–loss record, a 4.29 ERA, a 96 strikeouts in 121 2/3 innings.

Matsumoto recorded the Hold for the first time in the match against the Hokkaido Nippon-Ham Fighters on August 29. In 2020 season, he recorded with a 25 Games pitched, a 0–1 Win–loss record, a 3.49 ERA, a 6 Holds, a 27 strikeouts in 28.1 innings. In the 2020 Japan Series against the Yomiuri Giants, Matsumoto pitched after starter Tsuyoshi Wada in Game 4, became the his first Winning pitcher in the Japan Series, and contributed to the team's fourth consecutive Japan Series champion. On December 16, Matsumoto underwent surgery for a Spinal disc herniation.

In 2021 season, he pitched in a career-high 33 games, going 3-3 with a 3.79 ERA, four holds, and 59 strikeouts in 73.2 innings.

In 2022 season, Matsumoto was undergoing acupuncture treatment on March 23 when the treatment needle broke and the procedure caused him to miss the opening game. However, he won as a relief pitcher on May 25, and from then on he contributed to the team as a setup man who pitched in the 7th inning. In 44 appearances, he went 5-1 with a 2.66 ERA, 15 holds, and 60 strikeouts in 50.2 innings pitched.

References

External links

 Career statistics - NPB.jp
 66 Yuki Matsumoto PLAYERS2022 - Fukuoka SoftBank Hawks Official site

1996 births
Living people
Fukuoka SoftBank Hawks players
Japanese baseball players
Nippon Professional Baseball pitchers
Baseball people from Kanagawa Prefecture